The 1st AIBA African 2004 Olympic Boxing Qualifying Tournament was held in Casablanca, Morocco from January 15 to January 22, 2004. It was the first chance for amateur boxers from Africa to qualify for the 2004 Summer Olympics since the 2003 All-Africa Games. First and second place qualified for the Olympic Tournament in Athens, Greece, except for the heavyweight and super heavyweight events, which only qualified for first place. A total of 89 fighters from 18 countries competed.

Medal winners

Qualified

Light Flyweight (– 48 kg)

Flyweight (– 51 kg)

Bantamweight (– 54 kg)

Featherweight (– 57 kg)

Lightweight (– 60 kg)

Light Welterweight (– 64 kg)

Welterweight (– 69 kg)

Middleweight (– 75 kg)

Light Heavyweight (– 81 kg)

Heavyweight (– 91 kg)

Super Heavyweight (+ 91 kg)

Notes

See also
Boxing at the 2003 All-Africa Games
2nd AIBA African 2004 Olympic Qualifying Tournament

References
amateur-boxing
boxopen

African 1
2004 in Moroccan sport
Boxing in Morocco
January 2004 sports events in Africa